= River Valley Christian School (Illinois) =

Christian school in Elgin, Illinois, US

Coordinates: 42.0564°N 88.3440°W

- Elgin, Illinois; United States

Information
- Type: Private
- Religious affiliation: Christian
- Website: www.rivervalleychristianschool.org

River Valley Christian School (RVC) is a private, non-denominational Christian school in Elgin, Illinois, serving preschool through high school. It launched in fall 2026 as a merger of two long-standing Elgin institutions: Harvest Christian Academy (founded 2004 as a ministry of Harvest Bible Chapel) and Westminster Christian School (a ministry of Westminster Presbyterian Church operating for nearly 50 years).

The merger, approved by both schools' governing boards in 2025, combined the two campuses and communities into a single independent school, with the goal of expanding academic and extracurricular offerings and strengthening long-term financial sustainability. The final graduating classes under the Harvest Christian Academy and Westminster Christian School names finished in spring 2026; students beginning in fall 2026 are enrolled under the River Valley Christian School name.
